In mathematics, uniform absolute-convergence is a type of convergence for series of functions.  Like absolute-convergence, it has the useful property that it is preserved when the order of summation is changed.

Motivation 

A convergent series of numbers can often be reordered in such a way that the new series diverges.  This is not possible for series of nonnegative numbers, however, so the notion of absolute-convergence precludes this phenomenon.  When dealing with uniformly convergent series of functions, the same phenomenon occurs: the series can potentially be reordered into a non-uniformly convergent series, or a series which does not even converge pointwise.  This is impossible for series of nonnegative functions, so the notion of uniform absolute-convergence can be used to rule out these possibilities.

Definition 

Given a set X and functions  (or to any normed vector space), the series

is called uniformly absolutely-convergent if the series of nonnegative functions 

is uniformly convergent.

Distinctions 

A series can be uniformly convergent and absolutely convergent without being uniformly absolutely-convergent.  For example, if ƒn(x) = xn/n on the open interval (−1,0), then the series Σfn(x) converges uniformly by comparison of the partial sums to those of Σ(−1)n/n, and the series Σ|fn(x)| converges absolutely at each point by the geometric series test, but Σ|fn(x)| does not converge uniformly.  Intuitively, this is because the absolute-convergence gets slower and slower as x approaches −1, where convergence holds but absolute convergence fails.

Generalizations 

If a series of functions is uniformly absolutely-convergent on some neighborhood of each point of a topological space, it is locally uniformly absolutely-convergent.  If a series is uniformly absolutely-convergent on all compact subsets of a topological space, it is compactly (uniformly) absolutely-convergent.  If the topological space is locally compact, these notions are equivalent.

Properties 

 If a series of functions into C (or any Banach space) is uniformly absolutely-convergent, then it is uniformly convergent.
 Uniform absolute-convergence is independent of the ordering of a series.  This is because, for a series of nonnegative functions, uniform convergence is equivalent to the property that, for any ε > 0, there are finitely many terms of the series such that excluding these terms results in a series with total sum less than the constant function ε, and this property does not refer to the ordering.

See also
Modes of convergence (annotated index)

References

Mathematical analysis
Convergence (mathematics)